Pemiscot County is a county located in the southeastern corner in the Bootheel in the U.S. state of Missouri, with the Mississippi River forming its eastern border. As of the 2020 census, the population was 
15,661. The largest city and county seat is Caruthersville. The county was officially organized on February 19, 1851. It is named for the local bayou, taken from the word pem-eskaw, meaning "liquid mud", in the language of the native Fox (Meskwaki) people. This has been an area of cotton plantations and later other commodity crops.

Murphy Mound Archeological Site has one of the largest platform mounds in Missouri. It is a major earthwork of the Late Mississippian culture, which had settlement sites throughout the Mississippi Valley and tributaries. The site is privately owned and is not open to the public. The site may have been occupied from as early as 1200 CE and continuing to about 1541.

History
Bordering the river and its floodplain, the county was devoted to agricultural development and commodity crops. In the 19th and early 20th centuries, the major commodity crop was cotton, which was worked at the beginning mainly by enslaved African Americans.

After the Reconstruction era, four African Americans were lynched in the area, all during the early 1900s and in the county seat. This was a period of disfranchisement for African Americans, and included heightened violence against them by racist mobs.

To escape such this mistreatment, many African Americans left the county in the Great Migration, moving to big cities to seek employment. Also, with the mechanization of agriculture requiring fewer laborers, the county's population has continually declined since its peak in 1940.

Geography

Fishing is a popular activity among residents in the area.

Adjacent counties
New Madrid County (north)
Lake County, Tennessee (northeast across the Mississippi River)
Dyer County, Tennessee (southeast across the Mississippi River)
Mississippi County, Arkansas (south)
Dunklin County (west)

Major highways

Demographics

As of the census of 2000, there were 20,047 people, 7,855 households, and 5,317 families residing in the county. The population density was 41 people per square mile (16/km2). There were 8,793 housing units at an average density of 18 per square mile (7/km2). The racial makeup of the county was 71.76% White, 26.23% Black or African American, 0.25% Native American, 0.27% Asian, 0.01% Pacific Islander, 0.62% from other races, and 0.85% from two or more races. Approximately 1.57% of the population were Hispanic or Latino of any race. Among the major first ancestries reported in Pemiscot County were 31.9% American, 7.8% Irish, 5.6% English, and 5.5% German ancestry.

There were 7,855 households, out of which 33.60% had children under the age of 18 living with them, 45.00% were married couples living together, 18.50% had a female householder with no husband present, and 32.30% were non-families. 28.80% of all households were made up of individuals, and 14.30% had someone living alone who was 65 years of age or older. The average household size was 2.52 and the average family size was 3.10.

In the county, the population was spread out, with 30.00% under the age of 18, 9.10% from 18 to 24, 25.00% from 25 to 44, 21.10% from 45 to 64, and 14.90% who were 65 years of age or older. The median age was 34 years. For every 100 females there were 88.50 males. For every 100 females age 18 and over, there were 83.30 males.

The median income for a household in the county was $26,992, and the median income for a family was $33,945. Males had a median income of $27,476 versus $17,358 for females. The per capita income for the county was $15,599. About 24.80% of families and 30.40% of the population were below the poverty line, including 43.20% of those under age 18 and 23.20% of those age 65 or over.

Religion
According to the Association of Religion Data Archives County Membership Report (2000), Pemiscot County is a part of the Bible Belt with evangelical Protestantism being the majority religion. The most predominant denominations among residents in Pemiscot County who adhere to a religion are Southern Baptists (69.98%), Methodists (7.56%), and Churches of Christ (4.76%).

2020 Census

Politics

Local
The Democratic Party historically controlled politics at the local level in Pemiscot County. However, the county has not been immune to the growing Republican trend in Southeast Missouri.  In 2020, two Democratic incumbents switched parties, and Lisa Bowlby Sheckell (R) was elected in a contested election for the County Assessor. The Democratic Party continues to hold a majority of offices as of 2022.

State
The northern half of Pemiscot County is a part of Missouri's 149th District in the Missouri House of Representatives and is currently represented by Don Rone Jr.
(R-Portageville).

The southern half of Pemiscot County is a part of Missouri's 150th District in the Missouri House of Representatives and is currently represented by Andrew McDaniel (R-Deering).

All of Pemiscot County is a part of Missouri's 25th District in the Missouri Senate and is currently represented by Republican Jason Bean of Poplar Bluff. The 25th Senatorial District consists of Butler, Carter, Dunklin, Mississippi, New Madrid, Pemiscot, Shannon, and Stoddard counties.

Federal
Pemiscot County is included in Missouri's 8th Congressional District and is currently represented by Jason T. Smith (R-Salem) in the U.S. House of Representatives. Smith won a special election on Tuesday, June 4, 2013, to finish out the remaining term of U.S. Representative Jo Ann Emerson (R-Cape Girardeau). Emerson announced her resignation a month after being reelected with over 70 percent of the vote in the district. She resigned to become CEO of the National Rural Electric Cooperative.

Pemiscot County, along with the rest of the state of Missouri, is represented in the U.S. Senate by Josh Hawley (R-Columbia) and Roy Blunt (R-Strafford).

Blunt was elected to a second term in 2016 over then-Missouri Secretary of State Jason Kander.

Political culture

At the presidential level, Pemiscot County, lying in the Missouri Bootheel (one of the regions in Missouri most associated with the American South), was powerfully Democratic from shortly after the Civil War through 2000. From 1868 through 2000, it voted Republican only in Harding's, Hoover's, Nixon's, and Reagan's national landslides in 1920, 1928, 1972, and 1984, respectively. In 1968, it was the only county in Missouri to vote for George Wallace. 

In 2004, George W. Bush flipped the county from blue to red, albeit narrowly, and since then, the county has solidified its standing as a Republican bastion. As of 2020, the county has voted Republican five times in a row, with the Republican vote share increasing in every election. In 2008, Pemiscot County swung the most Republican of all the counties in the state, as McCain improved on Bush's vote share by fully 6.2%, already besting not only Bush but every Republican to have carried the county in at least the prior hundred years apart from Nixon in 1972. In 2020, Donald Trump posted the best showing for a Republican in the county in at least over a century, with his nearly 72% exceeding Nixon's 70%.  Similarly to other highly rural Southern counties in the 21st century, the Democratic raw vote total has decreased in every election since then as well.

As in most rural areas throughout Missouri, voters in Pemiscot County generally adhere to socially and culturally conservative principles, but are more moderate or populist on economic issues, typical of the Dixiecrat philosophy. In 2004, Missourians voted on a constitutional amendment to define marriage as the union between a man and a woman—it passed Pemiscot County with 84.73 percent of the vote. The initiative passed the state with 71 percent of support from voters, as Missouri became the first state to ban same-sex marriage. In 2006, Missourians voted on a constitutional amendment to fund and legalize embryonic stem cell research in the state—it failed in Pemiscot County, with 52.41 percent voting against the measure. The initiative narrowly passed the state with 51 percent of support from voters, as Missouri became one of the first states in the nation to approve embryonic stem cell research. Despite Pemiscot County's longstanding tradition of supporting socially conservative platforms, voters in the county have a penchant for advancing populist causes, such as increasing the minimum wage. In 2006, Missourians voted on a proposition (Proposition B) to increase the minimum wage in the state to $6.50 an hour—it passed Pemiscot County with 78.01 percent of the vote. The proposition strongly passed every single county in Missouri with 78.99 percent voting in favor as the minimum wage was increased to $6.50 an hour in the state. During the same election, voters in five other states strongly approved increases in the minimum wage.

Missouri presidential preference primary (2008)

In the 2008 presidential primary, voters in Pemiscot County from both political parties supported candidates who finished in second place in the state at large and nationally. Former U.S. Senator Hillary Clinton (D-New York) received more votes, a total of 1,270, than any candidate from either party in Pemiscot County during the 2008 presidential primary. She also received more votes than the total number of votes cast in the entire Republican Primary in Pemiscot County.

Education
Of adults 25 years of age and older in Pemiscot County, 58.2% possess a high school diploma or higher, while 8.4% hold a bachelor's degree or higher as their greatest educational attainment.

Public schools
Caruthersville School District 18 - Caruthersville
Caruthersville Elementary School (PK-05)
Caruthersville Middle School (06-08)
Caruthersville High School (09-12)
Cooter R-IV School District - Cooter
Cooter Elementary School (K-06)
Cooter High School (07-12)
Delta C-7 School District - Deering
Delta Elementary School (K-06)
Delta High School (07-12)
Hayti R-II School District - Hayti
Mathis Elementary School (PK-03)
Wallace Elementary School (04-06)
Hayti High School (07-12)
North Pemiscot County R-I School District - Wardell
Ross Elementary School - Portageville - (K-05)
North Pemiscot County High School - (06-12)
South Pemiscot County R-V School District - Steele
South Pemiscot County Elementary School (K-06)
South Pemiscot County High School (07-12)

Alternative/vocational schools
Diagnostic Center - Hayti - (K-12) - Special education
External Locations - Hayti - (K-12) - Special education
Oak View Learning Center - Hayti - (K-12) - Special education
Pemiscot County Vocational School - Hayti - (11-12) - Vocational/technical

Public libraries
Caruthersville Public Library  
Conran Memorial Library  
 Steele Public Library

Communities

Cities
Bragg City
Caruthersville (county seat)
Cooter
Cottonwood Point
Hayti
Hayti Heights
Holland
Homestown
Portageville (mostly in New Madrid County)
Steele
Wardell

Village
Pascola

Former village
North Wardell

Census-designated place
Hayward

Other unincorporated places

 Acorn Corner
 Bakerville
Braggadocio
 Channel
 Concord
 Covington
 Cunningham
Deering
 Denton
 Gayoso
 Gibson
Gobler
 Hermondale
 Ingram Ridge
 Kinfolks Ridge
 McCarty
 Micola
 Mid City
 Netherlands
 New Survey
 Oak Ridge
 Oakville
Peach Orchard
 Samford
 Shade
 Stubtown
 Tyler
 Vicksburg
 Yama

See also
National Register of Historic Places listings in Pemiscot County, Missouri

References

External links
 Digitized 1930 Plat Book of Pemiscot County  from University of Missouri Division of Special Collections, Archives, and Rare Books

 
Missouri counties on the Mississippi River
Missouri placenames of Native American origin
1851 establishments in Missouri
Populated places established in 1851